The Château de la Tournelle was a now-demolished castle on the left bank of the Seine in the 5th arrondissement of Paris on the quai de la Tournelle. The approximate site is now occupied by the La Tour d'Argent restaurant. After it were named the pont de la Tournelle and the quai de la Tournelle.

Gallery 

Tournelle
Former buildings and structures in Paris